This is a list of episodes for the American television series Baretta.

Series overview

Episodes

Season 1 (1975)

Season 2 (1975–76)

Season 3 (1976–77)

Season 4 (1977–78)

References

External links
 
 

Baretta